Paul Reynaud (15 October 1878 – 21 September 1966) was a French politician and lawyer prominent in the interwar period, noted for his stances on economic liberalism and militant opposition to Germany.

Reynaud opposed the Munich Agreement of September 1938, when France and the United Kingdom gave way before Hitler's proposals for the dismemberment of Czechoslovakia. 
After the outbreak of World War II Reynaud became the penultimate Prime Minister of the Third Republic in March 1940. He was also vice-president of the Democratic Republican Alliance center-right party. Reynaud was Prime Minister during the German defeat of France in May and June 1940; he persistently refused to support an armistice with Germany, as premier in June 1940, he unsuccessfully attempted to save France from German occupation in World War II, and resigned on 16 June. After unsuccessfully attempting to flee France, he was arrested by Philippe Petain's administration. Surrendering to German custody in 1942, he was imprisoned in Germany and later Austria until liberation in 1945, where he was released after the Battle of Itter Castle in which one of the leaders, German Major Josef Gangl, declared a hero by the Austrian resistance, gave his life, taking a sniper's bullet to save Reynaud. 

Elected to the Chamber of Deputies in 1946, he became a prominent figure again in French political life, serving in several cabinet positions. He favoured a United States of Europe, and participated in drafting the constitution for the Fifth Republic, but resigned from government in 1962 after disagreement with President de Gaulle over changes to the electoral system.

Early life and politics
Reynaud was born in Barcelonnette, Alpes-de-Haute-Provence, the son of Alexandre and Amelie (née Gassier) Reynaud. His father had made a fortune in the textile industry, enabling Reynaud to study law at the Sorbonne. He entered politics and was elected to the French Chamber of Deputies from 1919 to 1924, representing Basses-Alpes, and again from 1928, representing a Paris district. Although he was first elected as part of the conservative "Blue Horizon" bloc in 1919, Reynaud shortly thereafter switched his allegiance to the centre-right Democratic Republican Alliance party, later becoming its vice-president.

In the 1920s, Reynaud developed a reputation for laxity on German reparations, at a time when many in the French government backed harsher terms for Germany. In the 1930s during the Great Depression, particularly after 1933, Reynaud's stance hardened against the Germans at a time when all nations were struggling economically. Reynaud backed a strong alliance with the United Kingdom and, unlike many others on the French Right, better relations with the Soviet Union as a counterweight against the Germans.

Reynaud held several cabinet posts in the early 1930s, but he clashed with members of his party after 1932 over French foreign and defense policy. In June 1934, Reynaud defended in the Chamber of Deputies the need to devalue the French franc, whose belonging to the gold standard was increasingly harmful for the French economy, but in those years French public opinion was opposed to any devaluation. 

He was not given another cabinet position until 1938. Like Winston Churchill, Reynaud was a maverick in his party and often alone in his calls for rearmament and resistance to German aggrandizement. Reynaud was a supporter of Charles de Gaulle's theories of mechanized warfare in contrast to the static defense doctrines that were in vogue among many of his countrymen, symbolized by the Maginot Line. He strongly opposed appeasement in the run-up to the Second World War. He also clashed with his party on economic policy, backing the devaluation of the franc as a solution to France's economic woes. Pierre Étienne Flandin, the leader of the Democratic Republican Alliance, agreed with several of Reynaud's key policy stances, particularly on Reynaud's defence of economic liberalism.
The franc was devalued, in a range between 25% and 34%,  by the Popular Front government presided by Leon Blum on 1 October 1936.

Return to government
Reynaud returned to the cabinet in 1938 as Minister of Justice under Édouard Daladier. The Sudeten Crisis, which began not long after Reynaud was named Minister of Justice, again revealed the divide between Reynaud and the rest of the Alliance Démocratique; Reynaud adamantly opposed abandoning the Czechs to the Germans, while Flandin felt that allowing Germany to expand eastward would inevitably lead to a conflict with the Soviets that would weaken both. Reynaud publicly made his case, and in response Flandin pamphleted Paris in order to pressure the government to agree to Hitler's demands. Reynaud subsequently left his party to become an independent. However, Reynaud still had the support of Daladier, whose politique de fermeté ("policy of firmness") was very similar to Reynaud's notion of deterrence.

Reynaud, however, had always wanted the Finance ministry. He endorsed radically liberal economic policies in order to draw France's economy out of stagnation, centered on a massive program of deregulation, including the elimination of the forty-hour work week. The notion of deregulation was very popular among France's businessmen, and Reynaud believed that it was the best way for France to regain investors' confidence again and escape the stagnation its economy had fallen into. The collapse of Léon Blum's government in 1938 was a response to Blum's attempt to expand the regulatory powers of the French government; there was therefore considerable support in the French government for an alternative approach like Reynaud's.

Paul Marchandeau, Daladier's first choice for finance minister, offered a limited program of economic reform that was not to Daladier's satisfaction; Reynaud and Marchandeau swapped portfolios, and Reynaud went ahead with his radical liberalization reforms. Reynaud's reforms were implemented, and the government faced down a one-day strike in opposition. Reynaud addressed France's business community, arguing that "We live in a capitalist system. For it to function we must obey its laws. These are the laws of profits, individual risk, free markets, and growth by competition."
With Reynaud as Minister of Finance, the confidence of the investors returned and the French economy recovered.
Reynaud's reforms involved a massive austerity program (although armament measures were not cut). At the outbreak of war, however, Reynaud was not bullish on France's economy; he felt that the massive increase in spending that a war entailed would stamp out France's recovery.

The French Right was ambivalent about the war in late 1939 and early 1940, feeling that the Soviets rather than Nazi Germany were the greater long-term threat. Daladier regarded the war with Germany as the greater priority and so refused to send aid to the Finns, who were under attack from the USSR, then loosely allied to Germany, in the Winter War. News that the Finns had sued for peace in March 1940 prompted Flandin and Pierre Laval to hold secret sessions of the legislature that denounced Daladier's actions; the government fell on 19 March. The government named Reynaud Prime Minister of France two days later.

Prime minister, resignation, and arrest

Appointment
Although Reynaud was increasingly popular, the Chamber of Deputies elected him premier by only a single vote with most of his own party abstaining; over half of the votes for Reynaud came from the French Section of the Workers' International (SFIO) party. With so much support from the left, and opposition from many parties on the right, Reynaud's government was especially unstable; many on the Right demanded that Reynaud attack not Germany, but the Soviet Union. The Chamber also forced Daladier, whom Reynaud held personally responsible for France's weakness, to be Reynaud's Minister of National Defense and War. One of Reynaud's first acts was at a meeting of the Anglo-French Supreme War Council held in London on 28 March 1940, whose main outcome was the signing of a declaration with British Prime Minister Neville Chamberlain that neither of the two countries would sign a separate peace. A joint communiqué declared 'Both Governments mutually undertake that during the present war they will neither negotiate nor conclude an armistice or treaty of peace except by mutual agreement. They undertake to maintain after conclusion of peace a community of action for so long as may be necessary'.
On 15 June 1940 the French cabinet rejected a British proposal, imagined by Jean Monnet and defended by De Gaulle, for the union of both countries.
Reynaud abandoned any notion of a "long war strategy" based on attrition. Aiming at diverting German attentions from France, Reynaud entertained suggestions to expand the war to the Balkans or northern Europe; he was instrumental in launching the allied campaign in Norway, though it ended in failure. Britain's decision to withdraw on 26 April prompted Reynaud to travel to London to lobby the British personally to stand and fight in Norway.

The German breakthrough
The Battle of France began less than two months after Reynaud came to office. France was badly mauled by the initial attack in early May 1940, and Paris was threatened. On 15 May, five days after the invasion began, Reynaud contacted Churchill and famously remarked, "We have been defeated... we are beaten; we have lost the battle.... The front is broken near Sedan." Indeed, such was the situation regarding equipment and morale that Reynaud received a postcard found on the body of an officer who had committed suicide in Le Mans. It stated: "I am killing myself Mr President to let you know that all my men were brave, but one cannot send men to fight tanks with rifles."

On 18 May Reynaud removed commander-in-chief Maurice Gamelin in favour of Maxime Weygand.

On 26 May, around lunchtime, Reynaud attended a meeting in London with Churchill. At 2 pm Churchill reported to the War Cabinet that Reynaud had stated that the French military situation was hopeless, that he had no intention of signing a separate peace with Germany, but that he might be forced to resign and that others in the French government might sign such a treaty. At this stage Churchill told Reynaud that he did not rule out talks with Mussolini altogether (Italy was still neutral). The Foreign Secretary Lord Halifax met Reynaud later in the afternoon, before the latter's return to France. This was the beginning of the British May 1940 War Cabinet Crisis, in which Halifax favoured what was euphemistically described as "the Reynaud Option": approaching the Italians to see if acceptable peace terms could be negotiated, perhaps by giving up some British territory in the Mediterranean. Halifax was eventually overruled by Churchill.

On 28 May Churchill sent a telegram to Reynaud stating that there would be no approach to Mussolini at that time but still leaving the possibility open. Mussolini had rejected an approach by President Roosevelt along the lines suggested by Britain and France. On 28 May, it was learned that Italy was planning to enter the war on Germany's side, which would happen on 10 June.

In early June Charles de Gaulle, whom Reynaud had long supported and one of the few French commanders to have fought the Germans successfully in May 1940, was promoted to brigadier general and named undersecretary of war.

Support for an armistice; Reynaud's resignation
Reynaud vacillated a little on his return from London on 26 May, but otherwise wanted to continue to fight. However, he was unable to persuade enough of his colleagues. Italy entered the war on 10 June; on that same day, Commander-in-Chief General Weygand strode into Reynaud's office and demanded an armistice. At around 11 pm that night Reynaud and de Gaulle left Paris for Tours; the rest of the government followed the next day. De Gaulle was unable to persuade Reynaud to sack Weygand.

At the Anglo-French conference at the Chateau du Muguet, Briare, on 11–12 June, Churchill urged the French to carry on fighting, either in Brittany or in French North Africa, or by guerrilla warfare, meeting strong resistance from Deputy Prime Minister Marshal Pétain. At the Cabinet meeting on the evening of 12 June it was clear that there was a growing movement for an armistice, and it was decided to move to Bordeaux rather than to a fortified Brittany.

At the next Anglo-French conference at Tours on 13 June, Reynaud demanded that France be released from the agreement which he had made with Prime Minister Neville Chamberlain in March 1940, so that France could seek an armistice. Churchill said that he "understood" the French action but (contrary to later claims that he approved) that he did not agree with it. At the Cabinet meeting that evening (Churchill had returned to London rather than address the French Cabinet as Reynaud had wished) Pétain strongly supported Weygand's demand for an armistice, and said that he himself would remain in France to share the suffering of the French people and to begin the national rebirth. President Albert Lebrun refused Reynaud's resignation on 13 June.

Edward Spears recorded that Reynaud was, from the evening of 13 June, under great stress. Paul Baudouin and Marie-Joseph Paul de Villelume had been leaning on Reynaud to seek an armistice with Germany, as had his mistress, the Comtesse Hélène de Portes, a Fascist sympathizer. On 14 June Villelume and de Portes called on the American diplomat Anthony Joseph Drexel Biddle Jr. and stated that France had no alternative but to seek an armistice and that they were speaking on behalf of Reynaud, although Biddle did not believe them. 

At Cabinet on 15 June, Reynaud urged the Cabinet to adopt the Dutch example, that the Army should lay down its arms so that the fight could be continued from abroad; Pétain was sympathetic. Pétain was sent to speak to General Weygand (who was waiting outside, as he was not a member of the Cabinet). Weygand persuaded him that this would be a shameful surrender. Chautemps then suggested a fudge proposal, an inquiry about terms. The Cabinet voted 13-6 for the Chautemps proposal. Reynaud tried to resign on the spot but Lebrun shouted at him. Admiral Darlan, who had been opposed to an armistice until 15 June, now agreed, provided the French fleet was kept out of German hands. On 15 June, Reynaud threw two glasses of water over de Portes at dinner; a key telegram had been found in her bed after it went missing.

On 16 June de Portes kept putting her head around the door during a meeting and US diplomats testified that she was constantly coming and going from Reynaud's office.  President Roosevelt's reply to Reynaud's inquiry, stating that he could do little to help without Congressional approval, was then received on the morning of Sunday 16 June. Churchill's telegram also arrived that morning, agreeing to an armistice provided the French fleet was moved to British ports, a proposal unacceptable to Darlan, who argued that it would leave France defenceless. De Gaulle was in London that afternoon for talks about the planned Franco-British Union, a far-reaching and imaginative proposal which Churchill and his advisers had hastily put together in a desperate effort to support Reynaud against his armistice-minded ministers and keep France - but especially its extensive naval fleet - in the war on the side of Britain. It was De Gaulle who telephoned Reynaud to inform him that the British Cabinet had agreed, reporting that "a sensational declaration" was imminent, amounting to a proposal for no less than the union of the two nations into a single Franco-British government. Time was desperately short, and De Gaulle ended up dictating the "Declaration of Union" to an astonished and gratified Reynaud over the telephone, word for word, so that Reynaud could present it to his Cabinet that very afternoon in a bid to fend off armistice. What Reynaud did not know was that General Weygand had instructed army listeners to tap his phone, and therefore had advance warning of what was coming, robbing Reynaud of the element of surprise. When the French Cabinet met in Bordeaux that afternoon, Reynaud presented the British union plan and - with Georges Mandel - declared his determination to fight on, but events were moving fast and the grand British offer was by then not sufficient to win round the waverers. Contrary to Lebrun's mistaken recollection, no formal vote appears to have been taken at Cabinet on Sunday 16 June. The outcome of the meeting is unclear. Ten ministers wanted to fight on while seven favoured an armistice, though these included the two Deputy Prime Ministers: Pétain and Chautemps. An armistice was also favoured by Weygand. Another eight ministers were undecided, but ultimately swung towards an armistice. This time, Lebrun reluctantly accepted Reynaud's resignation, and the government of France - at this historic and fateful moment - fell into the hands of Petain and those who favoured armistice and, ultimately, collaboration with the German invader. De Gaulle later wrote that Reynaud was "a man of great worth unjustly crushed by events beyond measure".

After resignation
Julian Jackson writes that Reynaud felt guilty for 20 years for having let Pétain into power, and gave ever more convoluted explanations of what had happened: despite his own fighting spirit, apart from a brief vacillation on 26 May, "he had failed to be Clemenceau (France's great war Prime Minister of 1917-18), but missed the chance to be de Gaulle and never forgave himself". Reynaud later claimed that he had hoped Pétain would resign if the armistice terms were too harsh, which if true was wishful thinking in Jackson's view. There were claims that he could have mustered a majority in the Cabinet for fighting on, so he later claimed that he could not have argued against the political weight of the "softs", especially Pétain and Weygand, France's two leading soldiers.

Spears recorded that Reynaud appeared relieved to be rid of his burden. In the immediate aftermath, he appears to have been in denial, hoping still to meet Churchill at Concarneau on 17 June (in fact Churchill, who was at Waterloo Station, had cancelled his travel plans on learning of Reynaud's resignation).

Jules Jeanneney and Édouard Herriot, Presidents respectively of the Senate and the Chamber of Deputies, urged Lebrun to reappoint Reynaud as Prime Minister (all four men wanted to continue the war from North Africa). Lebrun felt he had little choice but to appoint Pétain, who already had a ministerial team ready, as Prime Minister. Pétain became the leader of the new government (the last one of the Third Republic), and signed the armistice on 22 June. De Gaulle had returned to Bordeaux at around 10pm on 16 June. He visited Reynaud, who still hoped to go to North Africa and declined to come to London. Reynaud still had control of secret government funds until the handover of power the next day, and made money available to de Gaulle. De Gaulle flew to London with Edward Spears at 9 a.m. on 17 June, and the next day made his famous broadcast announcing that he would fight on. It has been suggested that Reynaud had ordered de Gaulle to go to London, but no written evidence has ever been found to confirm this.

Reynaud would later provisionally accept Pétain's offer of the post of French Ambassador to the USA. Lebrun refused to confirm the appointment, apparently as he admired Reynaud and wanted to save him from association with the Pétain government.

Accident and arrest

Reynaud and de Portes left the Hotel Splendid, Bordeaux, driving southeast ahead of the advancing German armies, intending to stop at Reynaud's holiday home at Grès, Hérault, (other sources state they were bound for his daughter's home at Sainte-Maxime) before fleeing to North Africa. On 28 June, with Reynaud at the wheel, their Renault Juvaquatre car inexplicably left the road and hit a plane tree at la Peyrade, near Sète; de Portes was all but decapitated while Reynaud escaped with relatively minor head injuries. While hospitalized at Montpellier, Reynaud allegedly told Bill Bullitt, American ambassador, "I have lost my country, my honour, and my love."

Reynaud was arrested on his discharge on Pétain's orders and imprisoned at Fort du Portalet. Pétain decided against having Reynaud charged during the Riom Trial of 1942, but handed him over to the Germans instead, who removed him firstly to Sachsenhausen concentration camp, thence Itter Castle near Wörgl, Austria, where he remained with other high-profile French prisoners until liberated by Allied troops on 7 May 1945. Major Josef Gangl, a Wehrmacht officer who had gone over to the anti-Nazi Austrian resistance, was killed by a sniper's bullet while trying to move Reynaud out of harm's way during the Battle for Castle Itter on 5 May 1945.

Postwar career
After the war, Reynaud was elected in 1946 as a member of the Chamber of Deputies. He was appointed to several cabinet positions in the post-war period and remained a prominent figure in French politics. His attempts to form governments in 1952 and 1953 in the turbulent politics of the French Fourth Republic were unsuccessful.

Reynaud supported the idea of a United States of Europe, along with a number of prominent contemporaries. He was a member of the Consultative Assembly of the Council of Europe for ten years, from 1949 to 1959, where he worked alongside his old wartime allies Churchill, Spaak and others to build a united Europe as a way of preventing future wars and a recurrence of the Nazi atrocities. Reynaud presided over the consultative committee that drafted the constitution of France's (current) Fifth Republic. In 1962, he denounced his old friend de Gaulle's replacement of the electoral college system by a direct public vote for the Presidency. Reynaud left office the same year.

Appearance and private life
Reynaud was a physically small man, with "the countenance of a samurai who had been educated at Cambridge". His head was set deep between his shoulders, and he had "a sharp, nasal, metallic voice" and "mechanical" bearing.

By his first marriage in 1912 to Jeanne Anne Henri-Robert, he was the father of a daughter, Collette, born in 1914. At some time in the early 1920s, Reynaud was introduced to Hélène Rebuffel by Andre Tardieu, a friend of her father's. Rebuffel's father, however, was displeased at her relationship with a married man, actively seeking other suitors for her, and she was eventually persuaded to marry Comte Henri de Portes. After she had borne him two children, the marriage failed, and when Reynaud and his wife separated in 1938, Hélène de Portes was his mistress until her death in the 
road accident at Frontignan in 1940. Reynaud and his first wife were finally divorced in 1949. Reynaud then married Christiane Mabire (one of his former office assistants, who had voluntarily joined him at the Castle Itter in 1943) at Versailles in the same year, at the age of 71. Mabire had already borne him a son, Serge Paul-Reynaud, in 1945; they had two more children, Evelyne, in 1949, and Alexandre in 1954.

Reynaud died on 21 September 1966 at Neuilly-sur-Seine, leaving a number of writings.

Reynaud's government, 21 March – 16 June 1940

Paul Reynaud – President of the Council and Minister of Foreign Affairs
Camille Chautemps – Vice President of the Council
Édouard Daladier – Minister of National Defense and War
Raoul Dautry – Minister of Armaments
Henri Roy – Minister of the Interior
Lucien Lamoureux – Minister of Finance
Charles Pomaret – Minister of Labour
Albert Sérol – Minister of Justice
César Campinchi – Minister of Military Marine
Alphonse Rio – Minister of Merchant Marine
Laurent Eynac – Minister of Air
Albert Sarraut – Minister of National Education
Albert Rivière – Minister of Veterans and Pensioners
Paul Thellier – Minister of Agriculture
Henri Queuille – Minister of Supply
Georges Mandel – Minister of Colonies
Anatole de Monzie – Minister of Public Works
Marcel Héraud – Minister of Public Health
Alfred Jules-Julien – Minister of Posts, Telegraphs, Telephones, and Transmissions
Ludovic-Oscar Frossard – Minister of Information
Louis Rollin – Minister of Commerce and Industry
Georges Monnet – Minister of Blockade

Changes
10 May 1940 – Louis Marin and Jean Ybarnegaray enter the Cabinet as Ministers of State
18 May 1940 – Philippe Pétain enters the Cabinet as Minister of State.  Reynaud succeeds Daladier as Minister of National Defense and War.  Daladier succeeds Reynaud as Minister of Foreign Affairs.  Georges Mandel succeeds Roy as Minister of the Interior.  Louis Rollin succeeds Mandel as Minister of Colonies.  Léon Baréty succeeds Rollin as Minister of Commerce and Industry.
5 June 1940 – Reynaud succeeds Daladier as Minister of Foreign Affairs, remaining also Minister of National Defense and War.  Yves Bouthillier succeeds Lamoureux as Minister of Finance.  Yvon Delbos succeeds Sarraut as Minister of National Education.  Ludovic-Oscar Frossard succeeds Monzie as Minister of Public Works.  Jean Prouvost succeeds Frossard as Minister of Information.  Georges Pernot succeeds Héraud as Health Minister, with the new title of Minister of French Family.  Albert Chichery succeeds Baréty as Minister of Commerce and Industry.

See also

 Interwar France

Notes

References
Nicholas Atkin, Pétain, Longman, 1997, 
 Barber, Noel, The Week France Fell. New York: Stein & Day, 1976. 
 
 Lacouture, Jean. De Gaulle: The Rebel 1890–1944 (1984; English ed. 1991), 640 pp, W W Norton & Co, London. 
Paul Reynaud, In the Thick of the Fight, 1930–1945. London: Simon and Schuster, 1955
Roland de Margerie, Journal, 1939-1940, Paris, Éditions Grasset et Fasquelle, 2010, 416 p. 
Roberts, Andrew. The Holy Fox, The Life of Lord Halifax. London: Phoenix, 1991. 
Charles Williams, Pétain, Little Brown (Time Warner Book Group UK), London, 2005.

Further reading
 Connors, Joseph David. "Paul Reynaud and French national defense, 1933-1939." (PhD Loyola University of Chicago, 1977). online  Bibliography, pp 265–83.
 de Konkoly Thege, Michel Marie. "Paul Reynaud and the Reform of France's Economic, Military and Diplomatic Policies of the 1930s." (Graduate Liberal Studies Works (MALS/MPhil). Paper 6, 2015). online, bibliography pp 171–76.
 Nord,	Philip.	France 1940: Defending the Republic (Yale UP, 2015).

External links
World at war biography
Spartacus biography(Trotskyite)
 1939–45.org biography

 

1878 births
1966 deaths
People from Barcelonnette
Politicians from Provence-Alpes-Côte d'Azur
Republican and Social Action politicians
Democratic and Social Action politicians
Republican Centre politicians
Democratic Republican Alliance politicians
National Centre of Independents and Peasants politicians
Prime Ministers of France
French Ministers of Overseas France
French Ministers of Finance
French Ministers of War and National Defence
Members of the 12th Chamber of Deputies of the French Third Republic
Members of the 14th Chamber of Deputies of the French Third Republic
Members of the 15th Chamber of Deputies of the French Third Republic
Members of the 16th Chamber of Deputies of the French Third Republic
Members of the Constituent Assembly of France (1946)
Deputies of the 1st National Assembly of the French Fourth Republic
Deputies of the 2nd National Assembly of the French Fourth Republic
Deputies of the 3rd National Assembly of the French Fourth Republic
Deputies of the 1st National Assembly of the French Fifth Republic
20th-century French lawyers
University of Paris alumni
Sachsenhausen concentration camp survivors
Burials at Montparnasse Cemetery